Neo Rauch - Comrades and Companions (Original title: Neo Rauch – Gefährten und Begleiter) is a 2016 German documentary film directed by , about the painter Neo Rauch. The filmmaker followed Rauch for three years in his studio in Leipzig and at exhibitions in America, Asia and Europe.

Release
The film had its world premier on 2 November 2016 at Dok Leipzig. It was released in regular German cinemas on 2 March 2017.

See also
New Leipzig School

References

External links
Official website (in English)

2016 documentary films
2016 films
Documentary films about painters
Films set in Leipzig
German documentary films
2010s German-language films
2010s German films